Ceracris is a genus of grasshoppers in the family Acrididae, subfamily Oedipodinae, found in tropical Asia. C. kiangsu is the yellow-spined bamboo locust which infests Indo-China and southern China.

Species
The Orthoptera Species File and Catalogue of Life list:
Ceracris amplicornis Cao, Dang & Yin, 2019
Ceracris chuannanensis Ou, Zheng & Chen, 1995
Ceracris deflorata Brunner von Wattenwyl, 1893
Ceracris fasciata Brunner von Wattenwyl, 1893
Ceracris hainanensis Liu & Li, 1995
Ceracris hoffmanni Uvarov, 1931
Ceracris jianfenglingensis Feng, Qiao & Yin, 2018
Ceracris jiangxiensis Wang, 1992
Ceracris kiangsu Tsai, 1929
Ceracris nigricornis Walker, 1870- type species (subspecies nigricornis, locality Darjeeling)
Ceracris striata Uvarov, 1925
Ceracris szemaoensis Zheng, 1977
Ceracris versicolor Brunner von Wattenwyl, 1893
Ceracris xizangensis Liu, 1981

References

External links
 
 
 OSF: Ceracris

Acrididae genera
Caelifera